André Watts (born June 20, 1946) is an American classical pianist and professor at the Jacobs School of Music of Indiana University. In 2020, he was elected to the American Philosophical Society.

Life and early performances
Born in Nuremberg, Germany, Watts is the son of a Hungarian mother, Maria Alexandra Gusmits, a pianist; and an African American father, Herman Watts, a U.S. Army non-commissioned officer. André spent his early childhood in Europe, living mostly near army posts where his father was stationed.

He began to study the violin when he was four. By six he decided the piano was his instrument. When André was eight years old, Herman's military assignment brought the family to the United States. They settled in Philadelphia, Pennsylvania. His mother started him with his first piano lessons. As do many children, Watts disliked practicing. For encouragement, his mother would tell stories of the great pianist and composer Franz Liszt, making it clear that Liszt practiced faithfully. Watts found inspiration in Liszt, adopting his theatrical playing style. After the divorce of his parents in 1962, Watts remained with his mother, who supported them by working as a secretary and later as a receptionist.

Watts enrolled at the Philadelphia Musical Academy (now a part of the University of the Arts), where he studied with Genia Robinor, Doris Bawden, and Clement Petrillo, graduating in June 1963. He entered his first competition at nine, with forty other children, for the opportunity to perform with the Philadelphia Orchestra Children's Concerts. Watts won the competition playing a concerto by Joseph Haydn.

At age ten, Watts performed Mendelssohn's G minor concerto with the Robin Hood Dell Orchestra and at fourteen, Franck's Symphonic Variations, again with the Philadelphia Orchestra. At sixteen, he auditioned at Carnegie Recital Hall in a competition to play in conductor Leonard Bernstein's televised Young People's Concert series with the New York Philharmonic.

Career
Watts' performance of the Liszt Piano Concerto No. 1 in E-flat at a Young People's Concert on January 12, 1963, was videotaped and nationally televised on CBS on January 15, 1963. Before the concert, Bernstein introduced Watts to the national television audience, stating that he "flipped" when he first heard Watts play.

On January 31, 1963, Bernstein asked Watts to fill in for the ailing Glenn Gould, the scheduled soloist for the New York Philharmonic's regular subscription concert. Watts again played the Liszt E-flat Concerto. When he had sounded his final cadenza, the whole orchestra joined the audience in a standing ovation. Watts' first LP, The Exciting Debut of André Watts, was shortly thereafter released on Columbia Masterworks records and included the Liszt Concerto with Bernstein and the Philharmonic.

Following graduation, Watts enrolled at the Peabody Institute in Baltimore, where he studied part-time for a Bachelor of Music degree with pianist Leon Fleisher. The following year, he appeared at New York City's Lewisohn Stadium with conductor Seiji Ozawa, and the New York Philharmonic, performing Camille Saint-Saëns' Concerto No. 2 in G minor. In September 1963, he again performed the Liszt concerto at the Hollywood Bowl in Los Angeles. He opened the 1964–65 season of the National Symphony Orchestra in Washington, D.C., again performing the Saint-Saëns concerto. He returned to New York in January 1965 to perform Chopin's Concerto No. 2 in F minor. Watts made his European debut in a London performance with the London Symphony Orchestra in June 1966.

By 1969, he was on a full-scale concert schedule, booked three years in advance. Watts made his Boston debut in 1969 for the Peabody Mason Concert series. He graduated from the Peabody Institute in 1972.

In February 1973, Watts was selected as Musical America's Musician of the Month. Other honors and awards include doctor honoris causa from Albright College and Yale University, the Order of Zaire, a University of the Arts Medal from the University of the Arts in Philadelphia, and the National Medal of Arts.

By the mid-1970s, Watts was giving 150 concerts, recitals, and chamber performances per season, performing about eight months out of the year. In 1976, at age thirty, he celebrated his tenth consecutive appearance in the Lincoln Center Great Performers Series at Avery Fisher Hall. The PBS Sunday afternoon telecast was the first solo recital presented on Live from Lincoln Center and the first full-length recital to be aired nationally in prime time.

In November 2002, Watts suffered a subdural hematoma and underwent emergency surgery. In 2004, he also had surgery for a ruptured disc which was affecting the use of his left hand. He continued performing regularly after recovering from the surgeries.

In 2004, Watts joined the faculty at Indiana University, where he holds the Jack I. and Dora B. Hamlin Endowed Chair in Music.

In 2019, he underwent surgery for a nerve injury to his left hand resulting in the cancellation of several performances. He has reworked the Ravel Concerto for Left Hand to perform with his right hand and will be performing the work with the Detroit and Atlanta Symphony Orchestras.

Recording artist
Watts has recorded for several music labels. He signed a long-term exclusive contract with Columbia Masterworks Records on his 21st birthday. In 1977, he revealed that his contract had been terminated.

In 1985, he signed a recording contract with EMI, with whom he recorded until the early 1990s. He has also recorded for Telarc.

Watts has recorded a variety of repertoire, concentrating on Romantic era composers such as Chopin and Liszt, but also including Gershwin.

Awards and recognitions
 1964 Most Promising New Classical Recording Artist
 1973 Honorary Doctorate, Yale University
 1975 Honorary Doctorate, Albright College
 1984 Distinguished Alumni Award, Peabody Institute of Johns Hopkins University
 1988 Avery Fisher Prize
 1988 University Of The Arts Medal, Philadelphia
 2011 National Medal of Arts
 2013 American Classical Music Hall of Fame
 2014 Cincinnati MacDowell Society's MacDowell Medal
2020 Elected to the American Philosophical Society 
2021 Honorary Doctorate, Boston Conservatory at Berklee

References

External links

 
 , WNCN-FM, October 14, 1983

1946 births
20th-century African-American musicians
20th-century American male musicians
20th-century American pianists
20th-century classical pianists
21st-century African-American musicians
21st-century American male musicians
21st-century American pianists
21st-century classical pianists
African-American classical pianists
American classical pianists
American expatriates in Germany
American male classical pianists
American people of Hungarian descent
Columbia Records artists
EMI Records artists
Grammy Award winners
Jacobs School of Music faculty
Living people
Members of the American Philosophical Society
Musicians from New York City
Musicians from Nuremberg
Musicians from Philadelphia
Peabody Institute alumni
Piano pedagogues
United States National Medal of Arts recipients
University of the Arts (Philadelphia) alumni